Andreas Hagelund (15 November 1881 – 19 September 1967) was a Norwegian gymnast who competed in the 1906 Summer Olympics.

In 1906 he won the gold medal as member of the Norwegian gymnastics team in the team competition. He was born in Fredrikshald and died in Fredrikstad, and represented the club Fredrikshalds TF.

References

1881 births
1967 deaths
People from Halden
Norwegian male artistic gymnasts
Olympic gymnasts of Norway
Gymnasts at the 1906 Intercalated Games
Olympic gold medalists for Norway
Medalists at the 1906 Intercalated Games
Sportspeople from Viken (county)
20th-century Norwegian people